Adama Fofana (born 4 January 2001) is an Ivorian professional footballer who plays for MFK Vyškov, on loan from Danish club Vejle.

Club career
He made his Veikkausliiga debut for HIFK on 1 July 2020 in a game against KuPS.

References

External links
 

2001 births
Living people
Ivorian footballers
Ivorian expatriate footballers
Association football forwards
HIFK Fotboll players
Myllykosken Pallo −47 players
Vejle Boldklub players
MFK Vyškov players
Veikkausliiga players
Ykkönen players
Danish Superliga players
Ivorian expatriate sportspeople in Denmark
Ivorian expatriate sportspeople in Finland
Ivorian expatriate sportspeople in the Czech Republic
Expatriate men's footballers in Denmark
Expatriate footballers in Finland
Expatriate footballers in the Czech Republic